This is a list of the cultural monuments in Lichte containing all cultural monuments of the Thuringian municipality of Lichte / Lichtetal am Rennsteig (district of Saalfeld-Rudolstadt), including its sections (Bock-und-Teich, Geiersthal, Lichte and Wallendorf) as of December 2, 2009.

Single monuments in Lichte

Monuments to the casualties of the World Wars 
 in Lichte (Ascherbach / Waschdorf)
 in Lichte (Bock-und-Teich), B 281 Saalfelder Str., road junction to Piesau
 in Lichte (Geiersthal) on the Dürrer Berg
 in Lichte (Wallendorf) on the Kirchweg

Monuments of World War II 
 Lichte (Wallendorf) cemetery: memorial graves for 4 Polish forced labourers
 Lichte cemetery: Memorial plaque to 2 victims of the forced march of inmates from Buchenwald concentration camp in April 1945, who were found in the Finsterer Grund under the rail viaduct.

References

External links 
 Denkmalliste des Landkreises Saalfeld-Rudolstadt, December 2, 2009 (pdf) 

Tourist attractions in Thuringia
Lichte